"Hanabi" is a song by Japanese singer-songwriter Rina Aiuchi. It was released on 28 July 2010 through Giza Studio, as the fourth single from her eighth studio album Last Scene. The single reached number twenty-eight in Japan and has sold over 6,152 copies nationwide. The song served as the theme music for the Japanese television show, Happy Music.

Background
"Hanabi" became Aiuchi's last single under the name, since she announced her retirement from the music industry two days later of the release of the single. In April 2018, she released the first single under the name R, "Warm Prayer".

Track listing

Charts

Certification and sales

|-
! scope="row"| Japan (RIAJ)
| 
| 6,152 
|-
|}

Release history

References

2010 singles
2010 songs
J-pop songs
Song recordings produced by Daiko Nagato
Songs written by Aika Ohno
Songs written by Rina Aiuchi